Nationality words link to articles with information on the nation's poetry or literature (for instance, Irish or France).

Events
 Antoinette du Ligier de la Garde Deshoulières awarded the first prize given for poetry by the Académie française

Works published
 Anonymous, Westminster-Drollery; or, A Choice Collection of the Newest Songs & Poems Both at Court & Theaters (second part published in 1672)
 John Milton, Paradise Regain'd: A poem [...] To which is added Samson Agonistes, published in May (Samson Agonistes published separately in 1681)

Births
Death years link to the corresponding "[year] in poetry" article:
 April 6 – Jean-Baptiste Rousseau (died 1741), French poet and epigrammatist
 September 7 – Antoine Danchet (died 1748), French playwright, librettist and dramatic poet
 September 28 – Sarah Dixon (died 1765), English poet
 November 6 – Colley Cibber (died 1757), English actor-manager, playwright and Poet Laureate

Deaths
Birth years link to the corresponding "[year] in poetry" article:
 April 30 – Fran Krsto Frankopan (born 1643), Croatian poet and politician (executed)
 September 28 – Jean de Montigny (born 1636), French philosophic writer and poet
 Pierre Le Moyne (born 1602), French Jesuit poet
 Sokuhi Nyoitsu (born 1616), Chinese Buddhist monk, poet and calligrapher
 Yun Seon-do (born 1587), Korean poet and government official

See also

 Poetry
 17th century in poetry
 17th century in literature
 Restoration literature

Notes

17th-century poetry
Poetry